Abionic SA is a company specialized in the development of ultra-rapid in vitro diagnostic tests, located in Lausanne, Switzerland.

The  is implemented in intensive care units and emergency departments to enable early identification of sepsis using a proprietary biomarker, Pancreatic Stone Protein (PSP). Secreted mainly by the pancreas and stomach, PSP rises rapidly in the blood in case of sepsis development and up to 72 hours before today's standard of care. Thus, this is a good and sensitive warning signal to guide doctors in their decision to start antibiotic treatment. Besides the diagnostic value of PSP for sepsis, its availability at the bedside and the availability of the result in 5 minutes provides an additional opportunity to closely monitor patients at risk of developing sepsis.

The  is also used in primary care for the screening of iron deficiency, respiratory allergies and more recently for COVID-19 screening with an antigenic saliva and nasopharyngeal test.

History
Abionic was founded in 2010 at the Swiss Federal Institute of Technology in Lausanne (EPFL, École Polytechnique Fédérale de Lausanne) by Dr Nicolas Durand and Dr Iwan Märki.

Highlights of the company's development:

2012:
 First demonstration of the technology
 The company obtains ISO 13485:2003
 Fundraising of 3.5 million Swiss francs in series A
 Abionic receives the Swiss Excellence Product Award

2014 : Fund-raising of 8.2 million Swiss francs in series B

2015: First prototype allergy panel ready

2016 : 
 New facilities inauguration in Biopôle, Lausanne
 ISO certified automated production line
 Abionic becomes the ambassador of the Swiss Health Valley
 Signature of a first distribution contract on the Swiss market

2017 :
 CE mark for the IVD CAPSULE PSP test for early sepsis diagnosis
 CE mark for the IVD CAPSULE Ferritin test
 First allergy panel test registered at the FDA 
 Partnership with the Global Sepsis Alliance (GSA), and sponsor of World Sepsis Day 
 Fundraising of 25 million Swiss francs in series C

2018 : 
 ISO 13485:2016 certification obtained

2019 : 
 CE mark for the  2.0

2020 : Start of the commercialisation of the  2.0

2021 : 
 Distribution of IVD CAPSULE PSP in over 40 countries
 CE mark for the IVD CAPSULE COVID-19 Antigenic Saliva Swab test

2022 : 
 CE mark for the IVD CAPSULE COVID-19 Antigenic Nasopharyngeal test
 Increase of the company's production capacity to 2 million kits per year

Increase of the tests' portfolio with the development of D-Dimer (thrombosis) and CRP (inflammation) tests.

Products 

-	Test principle :

The test is based on mixing the patient's sample (whole blood, capillary, serum, saliva or nasopharyngeal sample) with a reagent containing fluorescent markers. The solution is then deposited on the capsule and enters nanochannels by capillary action. The volume-to-surface ratio then forces the molecules to interact immediately together, limiting their travel distance and reducing the incubation time to a few minutes.

-	The different diagnostic tests developed by Abionic:

 The IVD CAPSULE PSP is a quantitative serological test providing results within five minutes for the early detection of sepsis. PSP concentration increases rapidly and up to 72 hours before the onset of clinical symptoms. Its availability at the patient's bedside provides an additional tool to assist healthcare professionals in the management of antibiotic treatment and helps to limit the development of bacterial resistance, which is a major public health issue.

 The IVD CAPSULE Ferritin is a quantitative serological test providing results within 5 minutes from a 50 µL sample of capillary blood. It is intended to be used by healthcare professionals to identify  iron deficiencies, affecting mainly pregnant women, people with chronic diseases (heart failure, kidney disease, etc.), bleeding (ulcers) and inability to absorb iron.

 The IVD CAPSULE COVID-19 is a qualitative test performed with a saliva or nasopharyngeal sample and which provides a result within 2 minutes. It identifies the presence of the SARS-CoV-2 to identify contagious individuals and reduce virus spread.

 The IVD CAPSULE Aeroallergens is a semi-quantitative serological test at the point-of-care. It provides results within 12 minutes from a 50 µl sample of capillary blood. It is composed of 7 key allergens (IgE)  to help diagnose allergic asthma: Dog (Can f 1), cat (Fed d 1), dust mites (Der p 1 + Der p 2), Alternaria Alternata (Alt a 1) and timothy grass (Phl p 1 + Phl p 5).

Other tests are under development: D-Dimer, CRP, PCT.

Recognition and awards

References

Medical technology companies of Switzerland
Swiss companies established in 2010
Companies based in Lausanne